The following lists events that happened during 2013 in the Islamic Republic of Iran.

Incumbents
 Supreme Leader – Ali Khamenei
 President – Mahmoud Ahmadinejad (2005–2013)
 President – Hassan Rouhani (2013–present)
 Vice President – Mohammad Reza Rahimi (2009-2013)
 Vice President – Eshaq Jahangiri (2013-present)
 Speaker of Parliament – Ali Larijani
 Chief Justice – Sadeq Larijani

Events

January
 January 28 - Iran's state news agency announces that a monkey was sent successfully into space by the Iranian Space Agency and returned safely aboard the Pishgam rocket.

February
 February 3 - Iran indicates the possibility it will attend talks on its nuclear program in Kazakhstan if it believes intentions behind them are "authentic".

March
 March 2 - Giti Pasand Isfahan winner 2012–13 Iranian Futsal Super League .

June
 June 13 - Hassan Rouhani is elected as the seventh president of Iran.

November
 November 24 - Iran and six world powers reach an interim nuclear accord that sees Iran limit aspects of its nuclear program in exchange for sanctions relief.

Notable deaths
 January 1 - Mojtaba Tehrani, 79, Iranian Twelver Marja'.
 January 17 - Homayoun Khorram, 82, Iranian violinist, colorectal cancer.
 January 31 - Hassan Habibi, 76, Iranian politician and scholar, Minister of Justice (1985–1989); First Vice President (1989–2001), heart attack.
 February 21 - Nazem Ganjapour, 69, Iranian footballer. 
 February 24 - Farideh Lashai, 68, Iranian contemporary artist, cancer.
 March 31 - Ahmad Sayyed Javadi, 95, Iranian political activist and politician, Minister of Justice (1979), Minister of Interior (1979).
 April 1 - Asal Badiee, 35, Iranian actress.
 April 17 - Dariush Safvat, 85, Iranian musician, natural causes.
 April 20 - Hassan Alavikia, 102, Iranian spy chief.
 May 9 - Sadegh Tirafkan, 47, Iranian contemporary artist. 
 May 14 - Mohammad Ezodin Hosseini Zanjani, 92, Iranian Islamic prelate, Grand Ayatollah, complications from surgery.
 June 2 - Jalal Al-Din Taheri, 87, Iranian Islamic cleric.
 June 16 - Yousef Madani Tabrizi, 85, Iranian Grand Ayatollah. 
 June 17 - Jalil Shahnaz, 92, Iranian maestro and Tar master, natural causes.
 June 21 - Abdol-Aziz Mirza Farmanfarmaian, 93, Iranian architect.
 June 25 - Taghi Rouhani, 93, Iranian news anchor.
 July 16 - Hassan Pakandam, 79, Iranian Olympic boxer (1964) and team captain.
 August 23 - Nasser Sharify, 87, Iranian academic and librarian.
 August 30 - Lotfi Mansouri, 84, Iranian opera director (Canadian Opera Company, San Francisco Opera).
 September 7 - Mehdi Mohammadi, 60, Iranian football player and coach, heart attack.
 October 10 - Kazem Sarikhani, 35, Iranian Olympic judoka (2000), Asian champion (2000), brain damage.
 October 19 - Mahmoud Zoufonoun, 93, Iranian traditional musician, Alzheimer's disease.
 November 5 - Habibollah Asgaroladi, 81, Iranian politician and presidential candidate, Leader of Islamic Coalition Party (1998–2008), lung problems.
 November 10 - Safdar Rahmat Abadi, Iranian government official, deputy industry minister, shot.
 December 18 - Büyük Jeddikar, 84, Iranian footballer (Esteghlal F.C., national team), Alzheimer's disease.

References

 
Years of the 21st century in Iran
Iran
Iran
2010s in Iran